Åsum is a place name and surname in Scandinavia. The Old Norse name is derived from the words for ridge (ås) and home (um). Alternative spellings include Aasum, Aasumb, and Awsumb. 

Åsum may refer to:
Åsum, Denmark, a village and eastern suburb of Odense, Funen, Denmark
Norra Åsum, a locality in Kristianstad, Skåne, Sweden
Södra Åsum, a church in Sjöbo Municipality, Skåne County, Sweden

See also 
ASUM (disambiguation), an acronym for organizations
Awsumb, an alternative spelling of Åsum